Alan James Ryan  (born 9 May 1940) is a British philosopher. He was Professor of Politics at the University of Oxford.  He was also Warden of New College, Oxford, from 1996 to 2009. He retired as Professor Emeritus in September 2015 and lives in Summertown, Oxford.

Biography
Ryan was born on 9 May 1940 in London, England. He was educated at Christ's Hospital, Balliol College, Oxford, and University College, London.  Elected a fellow of New College in 1969, he later taught at Princeton University, and returned to New College, Oxford, in 1996 to take up the Wardenship. He was made a Fellow of the British Academy in 1986.

A political theorist and historian of political thought, Ryan is a recognized authority on the development of modern liberalism, especially the work of John Stuart Mill, having contributed directly to the 'Reversionary' school, which led to a re-examination of Mill's work from the 1970s. His academic work also takes in broader themes in political theory, including the philosophy of social science, the nature of property, the history of political thought, and liberalism of the 19th and 20th centuries.

Ryan has held positions at the Universities of Oxford, Essex, Keele and Princeton University and University of Virginia School of Law. He was also a Visiting Professor of Political Science at The University of Texas at Austin, Australian National University, The New School and many others.

Ryan is a regular contributor to The New York Review of Books, the London Review of Books, and The Times Literary Supplement, and continues to write on political theory and the history of political thought.

Books
The Philosophy of John Stuart Mill (1970): an examination of Mill's philosophy of science, its relation to his ethical thought, and a defence of the view that Mill's work is largely coherent, concentrating on Mill's A System of Logic.
The Philosophy of the Social Sciences (1970): an introduction to the philosophy of social science.
J.S. Mill (1975): a guide through the important works of Mill, and the themes to be found therein.
Property and Political Theory (1984)
Property (1987)
Russell: A Political Life (1993)
John Dewey and the High Tide of American Liberalism (1995)
Liberal Anxieties and Liberal Education (1998): given as a lecture series at the University of California, Berkeley, contains autobiographical material.
On Politics: A History of Political Thought: From Herodotus to the Present (2012) traces the origins of political philosophy from the ancient Greeks to Machiavelli in Book I and from Hobbes to the present age in Book II
The Making of Modern Liberalism (2012) exploration of the origins and nature of liberalism from the Enlightenment through its triumphs and setbacks in the twentieth century
On Machiavelli: The Search for Glory (2013): an analysis of Machiavelli's philosophy and its place in the politics of its time

References

External links

Prospect magazine
New York Review of Books
Alan Ryan: CV
Department of Politics and International Relations
Debrett's People of Today (12th edn, London: Debrett, 1999), p. 1715
Defence of Mill by Ryan as the greatest British philosopher

1940 births
Living people
20th-century British philosophers
21st-century British philosophers
English political philosophers
Historians of political thought
Philosophers of social science
Liberalism
Alumni of Balliol College, Oxford
Alumni of University College London
Academics of Keele University
Academics of the University of Essex
Princeton University faculty
Fellows of New College, Oxford
Wardens of New College, Oxford
Fellows of the British Academy
People educated at Christ's Hospital